The Smoky Mountain Conference – officially the Smoky Mountain Athletic Conference – was an intercollegiate athletic conference that existed from December 1926 to October 1966. Most teams in the league were located in Tennessee, and there were at times teams from Virginia and North Carolina. The first commissioner of the league was W. O. "Chink" Lowe, who had played college football for the Tennessee Volunteers; he served as commissioner until September 1941.

Members
The following is an incomplete list of the membership of the Smoky Mountain Conference.

Charter members of the conference when it was formed were; Carson–Newman, Emory & Henry, King, Maryville, Milligan, and Tusculum.

 School does not currently have an active football program.
 Cumberland's team is now nicknamed the Phoenix.

Football champions
The conference did not operate from late 1941 until mid-1946, due to World War II.

1927 – No champion
1928 – 
1929 – 
1930 – 
1931 – 
1932 – 
1933 – 
1934 – 
1935 – 
1936 – 
1937 – 
1938 – 
1939 – 

1940 – 
1941 – 
1942 – N/A
1943 – N/A
1944 – N/A
1945 – N/A
1946 – 
1947 – 
1948 – No champion
1949 – Emory and Henry
1950 – 
1951 – 
1952 – 

1953 – 
1954 –  and 
1955 – 
1956 – 
1957 – 
1958 – 
1959 – 
1960 – 
1961 – 
1962 – 
1963 – 
1964 – 
1965 – 

 School media guide inconsistent with contemporary newspaper reports.

Basketball champions
 1956 – Lincoln Memorial and Tusculum (regular season), Tusculum (tournament)
 1961 - Milligan (tournament)

See also
List of defunct college football conferences

References

 
College sports in Tennessee
College sports in Virginia